Liolaemus variegatus, the variegated tree iguana, is a species of lizard in the family Iguanidae.  It is from Bolivia.

References

variegatus
Lizards of South America
Reptiles of Bolivia
Endemic fauna of Bolivia
Reptiles described in 1984
Taxa named by Raymond Laurent